Pardon Me, You're Stepping on My Eyeball! is a young adult novel written by Paul Zindel, first published in 1976.

Plot summary
The novel follows two alienated teenagers in Staten Island, 15-year-old Louis "Marsh" Mellow and Edna Shinglebox, as they cope with their family issues. Edna's mother is agonized over her daughter's not having a sweetheart while Marsh reveals his father is committed to a psychiatric hospital in Los Angeles.

Reception
Kirkus Reviews wrote in 1976, "Compared with Judith Guest's recent Ordinary People... this is a broader, outside view of teenage crazies, splashed with caricature and pointed distortion. But Zindel does involve you — breathlessly — in one bizarre, increasingly frenzied scene after another."

References

1976 American novels
Novels by Paul Zindel
American young adult novels
Novels set in Staten Island